Greece competed at the 2012 Winter Youth Olympics in Innsbruck, Austria. The Greek team consisted of three athletes in two sports.

Alpine skiing

Greece qualified one boy and girl in alpine skiing.

Boy

Girl

Cross country skiing

Greece qualified one boy.

Boy

Sprint

See also
Greece at the 2012 Summer Olympics

References

2012 in Greek sport
Nations at the 2012 Winter Youth Olympics
Greece at the Youth Olympics